Jahangir (1569–1627) was the fourth Mughal Emperor.

Jahangir or Jehangir may also refer to:

 Jahangir (name), including a list of people with the given name
 Jahangir, Lorestan, a village in Iran
 Jahangir, Punjab, a village in India
 Jahangir-e Olya, a village in Iran
 Jehangir Art Gallery, in Mumbai, India

See also

 Salim (disambiguation), birth name of the emperor
 Adil-E-Jahangir, 1955 Indian film about the emperor
 Jahangir Park, in Saddar, Karachi, Pakistan
 Jehangira, a town in Pakistan